The Islands District is one of the 18 districts of Hong Kong. It is part of the New Territories. It had a population of 170,900 in 2018.

Hong Kong consists of a peninsula and 263 islands. The Islands District consists of some twenty large and small islands which lie to the south and southwest of Hong Kong. Notable areas that are part of the Islands District include Chek Lap Kok, the reclaimed island on which Hong Kong International Airport is located, Tung Chung on northern Lantau near the airport, and Discovery Bay, a large private residential area on eastern Lantau.

Islands of Hong Kong
Many islands of Hong Kong are actually not part of the district. Most notably, Hong Kong Island contains four districts itself. The term Outlying Islands tends to refer to the islands of the Islands District. The northeast point of Lantau and Ma Wan traditionally belong to Tsuen Wan District owing to their administration and transportation dependence of Tsuen Wan. Tsing Yi Island once was administrated by Tsuen Wan District and now by Kwai Tsing District. Whilst the Sai Kung Islands are part of the Sai Kung District, and the Tolo Channel Islands part of Tai Po District.

Demographics
With an area that is 16% of Hong Kong and a population that is 2% of Hong Kong, the Islands District is the largest in terms of area and also the least populated. It is therefore the district with by far the lowest population density of 783 per km2. The outlying islands are notable for a more relaxed way of life than that of Hong Kong Island and Kowloon Peninsula. The district has the third-youngest residents.

Collectively, Mui Wo and Tai O on Lantau, Cheung Chau, Lamma Island and Peng Chau are more populated than the rest of the area of the district.

Islands of the district
 Cha Kwo Chau
 Chek Lap Kok (Hong Kong International Airport is built here)
 Cheung Chau
 Hei Ling Chau
 Sunshine Island (Chau Kung To)
 Peaked Hill (Kai Yek Kok)
 Kau Yi Chau
 Siu Kau Yi Chau
 Lamma Island
 Luk Chau (George Island)
 Lantau Island (The largest part of the district)
 Discovery Bay
 Mui Wo
 Tai O
 Tung Chung
 Peng Chau
 Tai Lei
 Po Toi Islands
 Lo Chau (Beaufort Island)
 Mat Chau
 Po Toi
 Sung Kong
 Waglan Island
 Shek Kwu Chau
 Soko Islands
 Cheung Muk Tau
 Ma Chau
 Siu A Chau
 Tai A Chau
 Tau Lo Chau
 Yuen Chau
 Yuen Kong Chau

Transport
Most of the islands in the Islands District have ferry services linking them with each other and the remainder of the territory, along with Macau and nearby cities in the Pearl Delta, including Guangzhou and Shenzhen. Public ferry piers are located at Tai O (Wing Hong Street, Shek Tsai Po), Tung Chung, Hong Kong International Airport, Cheung Chau Wan, Mui Wo (Silvermine Bay), Lamma Island (Yung Shue Wan, Sok Kwu Wan), Discovery Bay, Chi Ma Wan, and Peng Chau.

However, only Lantau Island has a fixed link to the New Territories and the rest of Hong Kong. This is via the North Lantau Highway and the Lantau Link, part of the Airport Core Programme completed in 1998. Most recently, since 2018, Lantau is the location of the Hong Kong Port of Entry for the Hong Kong–Zhuhai–Macau Bridge.

Lantau is also the only island in the Islands District with a well-developed public transport network on land. It has the only MTR stations within the district; they are Tung Chung on the Tung Chung line and two on the Airport Express serving the airport and AsiaWorld Expo (Sunny Bay and Disneyland Resort on the Disneyland Resort line administratively lie in Tsuen Wan District). Finally, Lantau is the only island with franchised taxis and buses, the latter mainly provided by New Lantao Bus (although other operators serve the northern shore, the airport, Disneyland, and Discovery Bay).

See also
 List of islands and peninsulas of Hong Kong
 List of places in Hong Kong

References

External links

 Islands District Council
 List and map of electoral constituencies (large PDF file)
 https://web.archive.org/web/20041203114950/http://www.islandsdc.gov.hk/